The siege of Vienna, in 1529, was the first attempt by the Ottoman Empire to capture the capital city of Vienna, Austria, Holy Roman Empire. Suleiman the Magnificent, sultan of the Ottomans, attacked the city with over 100,000 men, while the defenders, led by Niklas Graf Salm, numbered no more than 21,000. Nevertheless, Vienna was able to survive the siege, which ultimately lasted just over two weeks, from 27 September to 15 October, 1529.

The siege came in the aftermath of the 1526 Battle of Mohács, which had resulted in the death of Louis II, King of Hungary, and the descent of the kingdom into civil war. Following Louis' death, rival factions within Hungary selected two successors: Archduke Ferdinand I of Austria, supported by the House of Habsburg, and John Zápolya.  Zápolya would eventually seek aid from, and become a vassal of the Ottoman Empire, after Ferdinand began to take control of western Hungary, including the city of Buda.

The Ottoman attack on Vienna was part of the empire's intervention into the Hungarian conflict, and in the short term sought to secure Zápolya's position. Historians offer conflicting interpretations of the Ottoman's long-term goals, including the motivations behind the choice of Vienna as the campaign's immediate target. Some modern historians suggest that Suleiman's primary objective was to assert Ottoman control over all of Hungary, including the western part (known as Royal Hungary) that was then still under Habsburg control. Some scholars suggest Suleiman intended to use Hungary as a staging ground for further invasion of Europe.

The failure of the siege of Vienna marked the beginning of 150 years of bitter military tension between the Habsburgs and Ottomans, punctuated by reciprocal attacks, and culminating in a second siege of Vienna in 1683.

Background

In August 1526, Sultan Suleiman I decisively defeated the forces of King Louis II of Hungary at the Battle of Mohács, paving the way for the Ottomans to gain control of south-eastern Hungary; the childless King Louis died, possibly drowning when he attempted to escape the battlefield.  His brother-in-law, Archduke Ferdinand I of Austria, brother of Holy Roman Emperor Charles V, claimed the vacant Hungarian throne. Ferdinand won recognition only in western Hungary; a noble called John Zápolya, from a power-base in Transylvania, challenged him for the crown and was recognised as king by Suleiman in return for accepting vassal status within the Ottoman Empire. Thus Hungary became divided into three zones: Royal Hungary, Ottoman Hungary and the Principality of Transylvania, an arrangement which persisted until 1700.

Following the Diet of Pozsony (modern Bratislava) on 26 October, Ferdinand was declared king of Royal Hungary due to the agreement between his and Louis's families, cemented by Ferdinand's marriage to Louis's sister Anna and Louis's marriage to Ferdinand's sister Mary. Ferdinand set out to enforce his claim on Hungary and captured Buda in 1527, only to relinquish his hold on it in 1529 when an Ottoman counter-attack stripped Ferdinand of all his territorial gains.

Prelude

Ottoman army

In the spring of 1529, Suleiman mustered a large army in Ottoman Bulgaria, with the aim of securing control over all of Hungary at his new borders by Ferdinand I and the Holy Roman Empire. Estimates of Suleiman's army vary widely from 120,000 to more than 300,000 men, as mentioned by various chroniclers. As well as numerous units of Sipahi, the elite mounted force of the Ottoman cavalry, and thousands of janissaries, the Ottoman army incorporated a contingent from Moldavia and renegade Serbian warriors from the army of John Zápolya. Suleiman acted as the commander-in-chief (as well as personally leading his force), and in April he appointed his Grand Vizier (the highest Ottoman minister), a Greek former slave called Ibrahim Pasha, as Serasker, a commander with powers to give orders in the sultan's name.

Suleiman launched his campaign on 10 May, 1529 and faced numerous obstacles from the onset. The spring rains that are characteristic of south-eastern Europe and the Balkans were particularly heavy that year, causing flooding in Bulgaria and rendering parts of the route used by the army barely passable.  Many large-calibre cannons and artillery pieces became hopelessly mired or bogged down, leaving Suleiman no choice but to abandon them, while camels brought from the empire's Eastern provinces, not used to the difficult conditions, were lost in large numbers. Sickness and poor health became common among the janissaries, claiming many lives along the perilous journey.

Suleiman arrived in Osijek on 6 August. On the 18th he reached the Mohács plain, to be greeted by a substantial cavalry force led by John Zápolya (which would later accompany Suleiman to Vienna), who paid him homage and helped him recapture several fortresses lost since the Battle of Mohács to the Austrians, including Buda, which fell on 8 September. The only resistance came at Pozsony, where the Turkish fleet was bombarded as it sailed up the Danube.

Defensive measures

As the Ottomans advanced towards Vienna, the city's population organised an ad-hoc resistance formed from local farmers, peasants, and civilians determined to repel the inevitable attack. The defenders were supported by a variety of European mercenaries, namely German Landsknecht pikemen and professional Spanish harquebusiers sent by Charles V.

Queen Mary of Hungary, who was the sister of the King of Spain and Emperor (Charles I of Spain and V of the Empire), in addition to 1,000 German  Landsknechts under Count Niklas Salm, sent a contingent of 700–800 Spanish harquebusiers. Only 250 Spanish survived.

The Spanish were under the command of Marshal Luis de Ávalos, with captains Juan de Salinas, Jaime García de Guzmán, Jorge Manrique, and Cristóbal de Aranda. This elite infantry excelled in the defense of the northern area and with discretion fire prevented the Ottomans from settling in the Danube meadows, near the ramparts, where they could have breached with enough space to work. These elite soldiers also built additional palisades and trap pits that would be essential during the siege.

The Hofmeister of Austria, Wilhelm von Roggendorf, assumed charge of the defensive garrison, with operational command entrusted to a seventy-year-old German mercenary named Nicholas, Count of Salm, who had distinguished himself at the Battle of Pavia in 1525. Salm arrived in Vienna as head of the mercenary relief force and set about fortifying the three-hundred-year-old walls surrounding St. Stephen's Cathedral, near which he established his headquarters. To ensure the city could withstand a lengthy siege, he blocked the four city gates and reinforced the walls, which in some places were no more than six feet thick, and erected earthen bastions and an inner earthen rampart, levelling buildings where necessary to clear room for defences.

Siege

The Ottoman army that arrived in late September had been depleted during the long advance into Austrian territory, leaving Suleiman short of camels and heavy artillery. Of those fit to fight, a third were light cavalry, or Sipahis, ill-suited for siege warfare. Three richly dressed Austrian prisoners were dispatched as emissaries by the Sultan to negotiate the city's surrender; Salm sent three richly dressed Muslims back without a response.

As the Ottoman army settled into position, the Austrian garrison launched sorties to disrupt the digging and mining of tunnels below the city's walls by Ottoman sappers, in one case almost capturing Ibrahim Pasha. The defending forces detected and successfully detonated several mines that had been intended to breach the walls. On 6 October, 8,000 men were dispatched to attack the Ottoman mining operations. They succeeded in destroying many of the tunnels, but they sustained heavy  losses when the confined space hindered their return to the city.

More rain fell on 11 October, and with the Ottomans failing to breach the walls, the prospect of victory began to fade. In addition, Suleiman was facing critical shortages of food, water and other supplies, while casualties, sickness, and desertions began to take their toll. The janissaries began voicing their displeasure at the lack of progress, demanding a decision on whether to remain or abandon the siege. The Sultan convened an official council on 12 October to deliberate the matter. It was decided to attempt one final, major assault on Vienna, an "all or nothing" gamble. The assault was launched on 14 October, but despite extra rewards being  offered to the troops, it was  beaten back, with the defenders' arquebuses and long pikes proving decisive. The following day, with supplies running low and winter approaching, Suleiman called off the siege and ordered a withdrawal to Constantinople.

With unusually heavy snowfall, conditions deteriorated. The Ottoman retreat was hampered by muddy roads along which their horses and camels struggled to pass.  Pursuing Austrian horsemen took many stragglers prisoner, although there was no Austrian counter-attack.  The Ottomans reached Buda on 26 October, Belgrade on 10 November and their destination, Constantinople, on 16 December.

Aftermath

Some historians speculate that Suleiman's final assault was not necessarily intended to take the city but to cause as much damage as possible and weaken it for a later attack, a tactic he had employed at Buda in 1526. Suleiman would lead another campaign against Vienna in 1532, but it never truly materialised as his force was stalled by the Croatian Captain Nikola Jurišić during the siege of Güns (Kőszeg). Nikola Jurišić with only 700–800 Croatian soldiers managed to delay his force until winter closed in. Charles V, now largely aware of Vienna's vulnerability and weakened state, assembled 80,000 troops to confront the Ottoman force. Instead of going ahead with a second siege attempt, the Ottoman force turned back, laying waste the south-eastern Austrian state of Styria in their retreat. The two Viennese campaigns in essence marked the extreme limit of Ottoman logistical capability to field large armies deep in central Europe at the time.

The 1529 campaign produced mixed results. Buda was brought back under the control of the Ottoman vassal John Zápolya, strengthening the Ottoman position in Hungary. The campaign left behind a trail of collateral damage in neighbouring Habsburg Hungary and Austria that impaired Ferdinand's capacity to mount a sustained counter-attack. However, Suleiman failed to force Ferdinand to engage him in open battle, and was thus unable to enforce his ideological claim to superiority over the Habsburgs. The attack on Vienna led to a rapprochement between Charles V and Pope Clement VII, and contributed to the Pope's coronation of Charles V as Holy Roman Emperor on February 24, 1530. The outcome of the campaign was presented as a success by the Ottomans, who used the opportunity to show off their imperial grandeur by staging elaborate ceremonies for the circumcision of princes Mustafa, Mehmed, and Selim.

Ferdinand I erected a funeral monument for the German mercenary Nicholas, Count of Salm, head of the mercenary relief force dispatched to Vienna, as a token of appreciation of his efforts. Nicholas survived the initial siege attempt, but had been injured during the last Ottoman assault and died on  May 4, 1530. The Renaissance sarcophagus is now on display in the baptistery of the Votivkirche cathedral in Vienna. Ferdinand's son, Maximilian II, later built the Castle of Neugebaeude on the spot where Suleiman is said to have pitched his tent during the siege.

References

Bibliography

 
 
 
 
 
 
 
 
 
 
 
 Sáez Abad, Rubén (2013), El Sitio de Viena, 1529. Zaragoza (Spain): HRM Ediciones. .
 
 Sellés Ferrando, Xavier (2000), "Carlos V y el primer cerco de Viena en la literatura hispánica del XVI", In: Carlos V y la Quiebra del Humanismo Político en Europa (1530–1558) : International Congress, Madrid (Spain) 3–6 July 2000].
 
 
 
 
 
 
 
 

Archduchy of Austria
Vienna
Austro-Turkish Wars
Vienna
Vienna
Military history of Austria
Vienna
Blockades
Vienna
Islam in Austria
Vienna 1529
Vienna 1529
Vienna 1529
Suleiman the Magnificent
16th century in Vienna
1529 in the Habsburg monarchy